The Krusha massacres near Orahovac, Kosovo, were two massacres that took place during the Kosovo War on the afternoon of 25 March 1999, the day after the NATO bombing of Yugoslavia began. 

At that time, witnesses reported that special police unit entered the village and separated the men and boys, and killed around 100 men and male teenagers over the age of 13. Human Right Watch reported that more than 90 men were killed. Then, the women and children were forced out. In 2020, Darko Tasić, a local Serb from the same village and member of the police reserve forces was convicted as one of the perpetrators of the massacre. It is one of the first cases in which the trial of one of the perpetrators has concluded.

One of witnesses of the murder was British journalist John Sweeney, who was in the place of the murder in that time, saw disposal of dead bodies in the Drini river, and later was an important witness of the trials of Krusha massacres.

War crime trials 

The massacre at Velika Kruša became a part of war crimes indictment against Slobodan Milošević and other Serbian political and military leaders:

See also 
 List of massacres in the Kosovo War
 War crimes in Kosovo

Notes

References

External links 
Human Rights Publication-Massacre in Pastasel, Orahovac 

Serbian war crimes in the Kosovo War
Massacres in 1999
Massacres in the Kosovo War
Law enforcement in Serbia
1999 in Kosovo
Massacres of men
Anti-Albanian sentiment
March 1999 events in Europe
Violence against men in Europe
Crimes committed by law enforcement